Ancient, My Enemy is a collection of science fiction stories by American  writer Gordon R. Dickson. It was first published by Doubleday in 1974. The stories originally appeared in the magazines If, Astounding, Analog Science Fiction and Fact, Space Stories and Fantasy and Science Fiction.

Contents

 "Ancient, My Enemy"
 "The Odd Ones"
 "The Monkey Wrench"
 "Tiger Green"
 "The Friendly Man"
 "Love Me True"
 "Our First Death"
 "In the Bone"
 "The Bleak and Barren Land"

References

1974 short story collections
Short story collections by Gordon R. Dickson
Doubleday (publisher) books